was a town located in Kitaakita District, Akita Prefecture, Japan.

In 2003, the town had an estimated population of 4,079 and a density of 10.97 persons per km². The total area was 371.92 km².

On March 22, 2005, Ani, along with the towns of Aikawa, Moriyoshi and Takanosu (all from Kitaakita District) merged to create the city of Kitaakita.

In popular culture
 Satoru Noda's historical manga series Golden Kamuy features a major character, Genjirō Tanigaki, who comes from the village of Ani and is a member of the Tōhoku-indigenous Matagi population.

External links
 Kitaakita official website 

Dissolved municipalities of Akita Prefecture
Kitaakita